More Than You Know may refer to:
"More Than You Know" (1929 song), a song written by Vincent Youmans, Billy Rose and Edward Eliscu
"More Than You Know" (Martika song)
More Than You Know (Out of Eden album), or the title song
More Than You Know (Dexter Gordon album)
"More Than You Know", a song by Chong Nee
More Than You Know, an EP by Axwell & Ingrosso
More Than You Know (Axwell & Ingrosso album), debut studio album by Axwell & Ingrosso
"More Than You Know" (Axwell & Ingrosso song), the title song